

mp-mv
MPI DMSA Kidney Reagent
MPI DTPA Kit - Chelate
MPI Indium DTPA In 111
MPI Krypton 81m Gas Generator
MPI Stannous Diphosphonate
MS Contin
Mucinex
Mucomyst
Mucosil
Multifuge
Mupirocin
mupirocin (INN)
muplestim (INN)
murabutide (INN)
muraglitazar (USAN)
murocainide (INN)
murodermin (INN)
muromonab-CD3 monoclonal antibody (INN)
MUSE (brand name for Prostaglandin E1)
Mustargen (Merck & Co.)
Mutamycin (Bristol-Myers Squibb)
muzolimine (INN)
MVC Plus

my

mya-myk
Myambutol
Myascint
Mybanil
Mycelex
Mychel
Mycifradin
Mycitracin
Myco-Triacet II
Mycobutin
Mycodone
Mycograb
Mycolog-II
mycophenolate sodium (USAN)
mycophenolic acid (INN)
Mycostatin
Mydriacyl
Mydriafair
myeloperoxidase (USAN)
myfadol (INN)
Myfed
Myfortic
Myidyl
Mykacet
Mykinac
Mykrox

myl-myt
Mylaramine
Mylaxen
Myleran (GlaxoSmithKline)
Mylotarg (Wyeth)
Mymethasone
Mymethazine Fortis
Myotonachol
Myoview
Myphetane
Myproic Acid
myralact (INN)
myrophine (INN)
myrtecaine (INN)
Mysoline
Mytelase
Mytozytrex
Mytrex